Cyril Bessy (born 29 May 1986 in Villefranche-sur-Saône) is a retired French cyclist.

Palmares

2007
1st Tour de la Creuse
1st Prologue (TTT)
2008
1st Classique Paris-Chambord-Vailly
1st stage 1 Tour des Pays de Savoie
2nd Grand Prix de la ville de Nogent-sur-Oise
3rd French National Time Trial Championships U23
2009
1st Classic Loire Atlantique
1st Prologue Tour Alsace (TTT)
2010
1st Prologue (TTT) and stage 1 Tour Alsace
3rd Paris–Troyes
2012
2nd Paris–Camembert

References

1986 births
Living people
French male cyclists
Sportspeople from Villefranche-sur-Saône
Cyclists from Auvergne-Rhône-Alpes